The Ærø League is a local political party on the Danish island of Ærø. Its founder is the former Centre Democrats member Ebbe Kalnæs. It was formed in 2004. In the municipal election in 2005 the party got one seat in the municipal council.

Local political parties in Denmark
2004 establishments in Denmark
Political parties established in 2004